Hugo Enrique Kiese Wisner (born 18 October 1954 in Tebicuary) is a former football midfielder that could also play as a striker, from Paraguay.

Career
Kiese started his career in Olimpia Asunción where he won the 1975 Paraguayan 1st division and was the league topscorer in the same year. He was transferred to Club America of Mexico for the 1975/1976 season where he became an important player for the club winning several titles and playing a total of 105 games scoring 19 goals. Kiesse then moved to Tecos UAG where he became the all-time topscorer of the club with 115 goals. He also played for Atlas. He became Mexican citizen.

Titles

References

External links

1954 births
Living people
Paraguayan emigrants to Mexico
Naturalized citizens of Mexico
Paraguayan footballers
Club Olimpia footballers
Club América footballers
Atlas F.C. footballers
Tecos F.C. footballers
Liga MX players
Paraguayan Primera División players
1975 Copa América players
Paraguay international footballers
Expatriate footballers in Mexico
Paraguayan expatriate footballers
Paraguayan people of German descent
Association football forwards